John Denman (born 13 June 1947 in Horley, Surrey) is an English former cricketer active from 1970 to 1973 who played for Sussex. He appeared in 49 first-class matches as a righthanded batsman who bowled right arm medium pace. He scored 713 runs with a highest score of 50 not out and took 70 wickets with a best performance of five for 45.

Notes

1947 births
English cricketers
Sussex cricketers
Living people